Equiano may refer to :
 
 Equiano (crater), a crater on Mercury named after Olaudah Equiano
 Equiano (horse), a French-bred Thoroughbred racehorse and sire
 Equiano or HD 43197 b, an exoplanet in Canis Major
 a subsea cable from Portugal to S.Africa, branching to Nigeria, owned by Google, named after Olaudah Equiano

People with the surname
 Olaudah Equiano (c.1745–1797), Nigerian writer and abolitionist